Year 213 (CCXIII) was a common year starting on Friday (link will display the full calendar) of the Julian calendar. At the time, it was known as the Year of the Consulship of Aurelius and Calvinus (or, less frequently, year 966 Ab urbe condita). The denomination 213 for this year has been used since the early medieval period, when the Anno Domini calendar era became the prevalent method in Europe for naming years.

Events 
 By place 

 Roman Empire 
 Emperor Caracalla leaves Rome and expels some German marauders from Gaul, while his mother, Julia Domna, rules the Empire. He defends the northern Rhine frontier against the Alamanni and the Chatti. Caracalla wins a victory over the German tribes on the banks of the River Main, and gives himself the title "Germanicus". It is probably while campaigning in Germania that he takes a liking to the caracalla, a Celtic or German tunic from which he acquires the name by which he is known.

 China 
 Cao Cao, the prime minister of the Han dynasty, is titled Wei Gong (Duke of Wei) and given a fief of ten cities under his domain. This later becomes the Kingdom of Wei.
 Battle of Ruxu: Cao Cao clashes against Sun Quan.

Births 
 Gregory Thaumaturgus, Christian bishop (d. 270)
 Sun Lü, Chinese general and nobleman (d. 232)

Deaths 
 Tiberius Claudius Cleobulus, Roman politician
 Wei Kang (or Yuanjiang), Chinese politician
 Zhang Ren, Chinese general under Liu Zhang
 Zhang Song, Chinese official and adviser

References